Billy West (born 1952) is an American voice actor, comedian, singer and musician.

Billy West may also refer to:

 Billy West (baseball) (1853–1928), professional baseball player
 Billy West (silent film actor) (1892–1975), American film actor, producer and director

See also
 William West (disambiguation)